Frank Cecil Percival Kippins (born 23 January 1925) is a former West Indian cricket umpire from Guyana. He stood in ten Test matches between 1958 and 1973. In all, he umpired 43 first-class matches between 1953 and 1974, most of them at the Bourda ground in Georgetown, Guyana.

He retired from umpiring in 1974 and migrated to the United States.

See also
 List of Test cricket umpires

References

1925 births
Living people
Guyanese cricket umpires
West Indian Test cricket umpires
Sportspeople from Georgetown, Guyana